is a subprefecture of Hokkaido Prefecture, Japan. The name is derived from Kamikawa no hitobito no Shūraku (Village of the Upstream People), a translation of the Ainu Peni Unguri Kotan. Settlement began in 1867. The sub-prefecture was established in 1897.

Asahikawa Airport stretches over the outskirts of Asahikawa City and Higashikagura in Kamikawa (Ishikari) District.

Geography

Municipalities

Mergers

External links

Official Website 

Subprefectures in Hokkaido